Stefano Fanucci (born 21 January 1979) is a former Italian footballer who played as a defender.

Biography
Fanucci was loaned to Teramo and Savoia in 1998-99 and 1999–2000 season and awarded the two clubs 100 million Italian lire and 300 million lire respectively for development bonus for the player in 2000. In summer 2000, he was sold to Livorno for 150 million lire. and in next season Livorno bought the remain rights for another 200 million lire (about €100 thousand).

References

External links
 

1979 births
Living people
Association football defenders
Footballers from Rome
Italian footballers
Serie A players
Serie B players
A.S. Roma players
S.S. Teramo Calcio players
U.S. Livorno 1915 players
Delfino Pescara 1936 players
A.C. Ancona players
S.S. Arezzo players
Cosenza Calcio players
Ternana Calcio players